B.R.M.C. is the debut studio album by American rock band Black Rebel Motorcycle Club, released on Virgin Records on April 3, 2001.

"Spread Your Love" was used in 2003 Vin Diesel film A Man Apart and features in the TV show Skins. It has also been used in a series of commercials for Ketel One vodka as well as The Cosmopolitan hotel in Las Vegas. The NME rated the song as the 27th best song of 2002.

Track listing
All tracks written and composed by Black Rebel Motorcycle Club.

 "Love Burns" – 4:05
 "Red Eyes and Tears" – 4:00
 "Whatever Happened to My Rock 'n' Roll (Punk Song)" – 4:38
 "Awake" – 6:12
 "White Palms" – 4:55
 "As Sure as the Sun" – 7:27 (5:52 on some releases)
 "Rifles" – 5:30 (7:02 on some releases)
 "Too Real" – 4:55
 "Spread Your Love" – 3:45
 "Head Up High" – 5:35
 "Salvation" – 6:06

Japanese edition bonus tracks
 "Screaming Gun" – 3:14
 "At My Door" – 4:45
 "Down Here" – 3:33

EU edition bonus tracks (2008 reissue)
 "At My Door" - 3:33
 "Screaming Gun" – 3:14
 "Tonight's With You" – 5:53
 "Loaded Gun" – 6:08

Charts

Weekly charts

Year-end charts

References

2001 debut albums
Black Rebel Motorcycle Club albums
Virgin Records albums
Albums recorded at Sound City Studios